Imamul Aroos (1816–1898) also known Quthubu zamaan Mappillai Lebbai Alim was scholar, writer, poet, preacher and reformer. He was one notable contributor for Arwi (Arabic Tamil) literature. He also founder of Aroosiyatul Qadiriya tariqa (branch of qadiri Sufi order).

Early life 
Imaul Aroos was born in Kayalpattinam , South India. His father was Wellai Ahmadu Alim.
His birth name was Sayyid Muhammad. Imamul Aroos's family moved to Kilakkarai, South India at his age of two. He is a descendant of the Caliph Abu Bakr, tracing his lineage through Sadaq Maraikkayar, (a companion of Nagore Shahul Hamid), who was a descendant of Muhammad Khalji.

Education
Imaul Aroos memorized Al-Quran before the age of ten and he studied Tafsir, Hadith, Fiqh, Tasawwuf and Islamic history and other fundamental religious under his father. Later Imamul Aroos studied under Taika sahib wali in Kilakkarai. He studied various Islamic Sciences under his teacher. Also, he studied under many great scholars of that time.

Later life
Imamul Aroos married daughter of his teacher taika shaib and Taika sahib wali grant kilafath (Authority of train and follow Sufi order) to Imaul Aroos. Imamul Aroos inherited the Arusiyyah Madrasah (seminary) from his father-in-law, Shaikh 'Abd al-Qādir al-Kirkari, he renovated the library and amassed a wide collection of manuscripts.

Imamul Aroos who had earlier visited to Sri Lanka as businessman was pained to see the pathetic condition in which the Muslims of the Island had been placed as a result of the oppressive rules of Europeans. The young businessman who could not bear the thought of such situation, abandoned the course of his business activities and embarked on missionary works.

He visited many Arab countries. When he went to makkah and madina, he was honored by notables there. some of whom become his disciples. The display of oratorical and literary talents of a very high degree by this non-Arab, caused astonishment to the Arab intelligentsia. He found to his astonishment that the copy of his own 'Minhatu Sarandib' had been preserved with reverence in a library in the holy city of Makkah.

Social reformation
The Muslim Coastal regions areas of Tamil Nadu like Kayalpattinam and Kilakkarai became worst affected victims of Portuguese atrocities during Portuguese rule in Tamil Nadu (1501–1575 AD). During Portuguese rule from 1505 to 1658 AD, They destroyed almost all Muslim institutions and monuments in Sri Lanka, resulting in a serve blow to the old grandeur of Muslim culture. They were unable to carry on their social transaction in Islamic Way. In short, they could not live as Muslims.

Imamul Aroos contribute to Islamic revival in Tamil Nadu and Sri Lanka. He was one of notable reformer in his time. He built hundreds of mosques and institutions in Sri Lanka, after destruction of Muslim institutions and monuments during Portuguese rule. According to the record available with the association founded by him in 1848, had been instrumental building over 350 mosques with attached arwi school in Sri Lanka. He has also established several maktabs and built some mosques in India. For each and every such mosque built, both in Tamil Nadu and Sri Lanka. He has composed Arabic poems commending the services of those who helped in the construction and other associated activities. Every one of such stanza embodies chronogram which expresses the year of commencement or completion of the construction.

The people of Sri Lanka are well aware that traveling to the remote places such as Marichikkaddi and Karadikkuli even in these days with modern transportation is very tiresome and dangerous, as the area is infested with wild animals and the roads are very difficult to track through. But, Imamul Arus managed to visit even such remote and dangerous areas 150 years ago and constructed mosques and schools in those desolate villages. This speaks of the selfless nature of all of his efforts in public causes.

Works of Imamul Aroos 
Imamul Aroos was one of great Arwi scholar and Contribute Arwi literature. Imaul Aroos alone has produced about 100 large works and about 200 minor works. Some  of  them given here :
 Maghani
 Fathud  Dayyan
 Fathul Matin
 Ganimatus Salikin
 Fathus Salam
 Ratibul Jalaliyyah
 Talai Fathiha
 Minhatul Sarandib Fi Madahil Habib
 Madinatun Nuhas
 Mawahibullahil Aliyyi Fi Manaqibish Shail Barbaliyyi

See also 
 Thaika Ahmad Abdul Qadir
 Thaika Shuaib
 Sheikh Mustafa
Arusiyyah Madrasah
Arwi or Arabic-Tamil
Tamil Muslim

References

External links
Biography of Imamul Aroos
Short Biography of Imamul Aroos

1816 births
1898 deaths
Islam in Tamil Nadu
People from Thoothukudi
19th-century Muslim theologians
Qadiri order
Scholars of Sufism
Indian Sufi religious leaders
Sunni Sufis